The 2017 Kansas City Royals season was the 49th season for the franchise, and their 45th at Kauffman Stadium. The Royals opened the season at the Minnesota Twins on April 3, 2017 and finished the season at home against the Arizona Diamondbacks on October 1. They failed to make the playoffs for the second consecutive season.

Offseason

Transactions
November 3: C Drew Butera and RHP Peter Moylan elected free agency.
November 4: RHP Edinson Vólquez, RHP Kris Medlen, and DH Kendrys Morales elected free agency.
November 5: RHP Luke Hochevar elected free agency.
November 18: C Tony Cruz designated for assignment.  C Drew Butera signed.  C Cam Gallagher, RHP Andrew Edwards, Jake Junis, and 1B Samir Dueñez signed from minors.
November 23: C Tony Cruz released.
December 1: RHP Brooks Pounders traded to the Los Angeles Angels for RHP Jared Ruxer.
December 7: RHP Wade Davis traded to the Chicago Cubs for LF Jorge Soler
January 3: RHP Sam Lewis traded to the Arizona Diamondbacks for LF Peter O'Brien.
January 6: LF Jarrod Dyson traded to the Seattle Mariners for RHP Nate Karns.
February 1: DH Brandon Moss signed.
February 8: RHP Alec Mills traded to the Chicago Cubs for CF Donald Dewees, Jr.  RHP Jason Hammel signed.
February 15: LHP Travis Wood signed.

Yordano Ventura

On the morning of January 22, 2017, it was announced that Kansas City Royals pitcher Yordano Ventura was killed in a car accident in the Dominican Republic.

Regular season
The team's 16–4 win over the Detroit Tigers on July 20, 2017, was the first time in franchise history that the Royals had recorded four 4-run innings in a game. In the month of August, the Royals set a dubious franchise record of 45 innings without scoring a run, spanning more than 4 games. It was the longest such streak by any team since the pitching mound was lowered in the late 1960s.

Game log 

|-style=background:#fbb
|1||April 3||@ Twins || 1–7 || Santana (1–0) || Strahm (0–1) ||—|| 39,615 || 0–1 || L1
|-style=background:#fbb
|2||April 5||@ Twins || 1–9 ||  Santiago (1–0) || Kennedy (0–1) ||—|| 15,171 || 0–2 || L2
|-style=background:#fbb
|3||April 6||@ Twins || 3–5 || Rogers (1–0) || Minor (0–1) || Kintzler (1) || 16,078 || 0–3 || L3
|-style=background:#bfb;
|4||April 7||@ Astros || 5–1 || Vargas (1–0) || Fiers (0–1) ||—|| 30,491 || 1–3 || W1
|-style=background:#bfb;
|5||April 8||@ Astros  || 7–3 || Duffy (1–0) || Gregerson (0–1) ||—|| 35,373 || 2–3 ||W2
|-style=background:#fbb
|6||April 9||@ Astros  || 4–5 (12) || Devenski (1–0) || Strahm (0–2) ||—|| 32,411 || 2–4 ||L1
|-style=background:#fbb
|7||April 10||A's|| 0–2 || Cotton (1–1) || Kennedy (0–2) || Doolittle (1) || 40,019 || 2–5 || L2
|-style=background:#fbb
|8||April 12||A's|| 3–8 || Triggs (2–0) || Hammel (0–1) ||—|| 24,380 || 2–6 || L3
|-style=background:#bfb;
|9||April 13||A's|| 3–1 || Vargas (2–0) || Hahn (0–1) || Herrera (1) || 22,160 || 3–6 || W1
|-style=background:#bfb;
|10||April 14||Angels|| 7–1 || Duffy (2–0) || Ramírez (2–1) ||—|| 26,838 || 4–6 || W2
|-style=background:#bfb;
|11||April 15||Angels|| 3–2 || Soria (1–0) || Alvarez (0–1) || Herrera (2) || 24,162 || 5–6 || W3
|-style=background:#bfb;
|12||April 16||Angels|| 1–0 || Herrera (1–0) || Parker (0–1) ||—|| 27,950 || 6–6 || W4
|-style=background:#fbb
|13||April 18||Giants|| 2–1 (11)|| Law (1–0) || Alexander (0–1) || Melancon (3) || 20,863 || 6–7 || L1
|-style=background:#bfb;
|14||April 19||Giants|| 2–0 || Vargas (3–0) || Bumgarner (0–3) || Herrera (3) || 24,402 || 7–7 || W1
|-style=background:#fbb
|15||April 20 ||@ Rangers|| 0–1 (13) || Álvarez (1–0) || Wood (0–1)||—|| 26,898 || 7–8 || L1
|-style=background:#fbb
|16||April 21||@ Rangers|| 2–6 || Hamels (1–0) || Karns (0–1) ||—|| 31,320 || 7–9 || L2
|-style=background:#fbb
|17||April 22||@ Rangers|| 1–2 || Bush (1–0) || Wood (0–2) ||—|| 41,446 || 7–10 || L3
|-style=background:#fbb
|18||April 23||@ Rangers||2–5||Darvish (2–2)||Hammel (0–2)||Bush (1)||37,177 || 7–11||L4
|-style=background:#fbb
|19||April 24||@ White Sox|| 1–12||González (3–0)||Vargas (3–1) ||—||11,484|| 7–12||L5
|-style=background:#fbb
|20||April 25||@ White Sox|| 5–10 || Jennings (2–0) || Duffy (2–1) || — || 14,591 || 7–13 || L6
|-style=background:#fbb
|21||April 26||@  White Sox || 2–5 || Quintana (1–4) || Karns (0–2) || Robertson (5) || 18,218 || 7–14 || L7
|-style=background:#fbb
|22||April 28||Twins|| 4–6 || Breslow (1–0) || Soria (1–1)|| Kintzler (6) || 27,911 || 7–15 || L8
|-style=background:#bbb
|—||April 29||Twins || colspan="7"| Postponed (rain) (Rescheduled for July 1st)
|-style=background:#fbb
|23||April 30||Twins|| 5–7 || Hughes (4–1) || Hammel (0–3) || Kintzler (7) || 32,685 || 7–16|| L9
|-

|-style=background:#bfb
|24||May 1||White Sox|| 6–1 || Vargas (4–1) || Covey (0–2) ||—|| 20,148 || 8–16 || W1
|-style=background:#fbb
|25||May 2||White Sox|| 0–6 || Quintana (2–4) || Duffy (2–2) ||—|| 18,604 || 8–17 || L1
|-style=background:#bfb
|26||May 3||White Sox|| 6–1 || Karns (1–2) || Pelfrey (0–2) ||—|| 22,298 || 9–17 || W1
|-style=background:#fbb
|27||May 4||White Sox|| 3–8 || Holland (3–2) || Kennedy (0–3) ||—|| 36,525 || 9–18 || L1
|-style=background:#bfb
|28||May 5||Indians|| 3–1 || Hammel (1–3) || Salazar (2–3) || Herrera (4) || 25,722 || 10–18 || W1
|-style=background:#fbb
|29||May 6||Indians|| 1–3 || Miller (2–0)  || Herrera (1–1)  || Allen (8)  || 23,743 || 10–19 || L1
|-style=background:#fbb
|30||May 7||Indians|| 0–1 || Clevinger (1–0)  || Duffy (2–3)  || Allen (9)  || 25,754 || 10–20 || L2
|-style=background:#bfb
|31||May 8||@ Rays|| 7–3 || Karns (2–2) || Snell (0–3) ||—|| 12,826 || 11–20 || W1
|-style=background:#bfb
|32||May 9||@ Rays|| 7–6 (12)|| Junis (1–0) || Moreno (0–1) || Herrera (5)|| 9,921 || 12–20 || W2
|-style=background:#fbb
|33||May 10||@ Rays|| 1–12 || Archer (3–1) || Hammel (1–4) ||—|| 9,320 || 12–21 || L1
|-style=background:#bfb
|34||May 11||@ Rays|| 6–0 || Vargas (5–1) || Odorizzi (2–2) ||—|| 9,340 || 13–21 || W1
|-style=background:#bfb
|35||May 12||Orioles|| 3–2 || Soria (2–1) || Nuño (0–1) || Herrera (6) || 25,467 || 14–21 || W2
|-style=background:#bfb
|36||May 13||Orioles|| 4–3 || Maness (1–0) || Asher (1–2) || Herrera (7) || 24,662 || 15–21 || W3
|-style=background:#bfb
|37||May 14||Orioles|| 9–8 || Strahm (1–2) || Bleier (0–1) || Herrera (8) || 30,662 || 16–21 || W4
|-style=background:#fbb
|38||May 16||Yankees|| 1–7 || Sabathia (3–2) || Hammel (1–5) ||—|| 30,878 || 16–22 || L1
|-style=background:#fbb
|39||May 17||Yankees|| 7–11 || Pineda (4–2) || Vargas (5–2) || Betances (1) || 22,899 || 16–23 || L2
|-style=background:#bfb
|40||May 18||Yankees|| 5–1 || Duffy (3–3) || Montgomery (2–3) ||—|| 22,803 || 17–23 || W1
|-style=background:#fbb
|41||May 19||@ Twins|| 3–4 (10) || Kintzler (2–0) || Alburquerque (0–1) ||—|| 23,553 || 17–24 || L1
|-style=background:#bbb
|—||May 20||@ Twins|| colspan="7" | Postponed (rain)  (Rescheduled for May 21)
|-style=background:#bfb
|42||May 21||@ Twins|| 6–4 || Minor (1–1) || Hughes (4–3) || Herrera (9) || || 18–24 || W1
|-style=background:#fbb
|43||May 21||@ Twins|| 4–8 || Mejía (1–1) || Kennedy (0–4) ||—|| 27,852 || 18–25 || L1
|-style=background:#fbb
|44||May 22||@ Yankees|| 2–4 || Pineda (5–2) || Vargas (5–3) || Betances (3) || 35,005 || 18–26 || L2
|-style=background:#bfb
|45||May 23||@ Yankees|| 6–2 || Duffy (4–3) || Warren (1–1) ||—|| 35,931 || 19–26 || W1
|-style=background:#fbb
|46||May 24||@ Yankees|| 0–3 || Severino (3–2) || Hammel (1–6) || Betances (4) || 34,610 || 19–27 || L1
|-style=background:#bbb
|—||May 25||@ Yankees|| colspan="7" |Postponed (rain)  (Rescheduled for September 25)
|-style=background:#bfb
|47||May 26||@ Indians|| 6–4 || Minor (2–1) || Shaw (1–1) || Herrera (10) || 29,603 || 20–27 || W1
|-style=background:#bfb
|48||May 27||@ Indians|| 5–2 || Vargas (6–3) || Salazar (3–5) || Herrera (11) || 30,920 || 21–27 || W2
|-style=background:#fbb
|49||May 28||@ Indians|| 1–10 || Tomlin (3–6) || Duffy (4–4) ||—|| 23,136 || 21–28 || L1
|-style=background:#fbb
|50||May 29||Tigers|| 7–10 || Rodríguez (2–5) || Soria (2–2) || Wilson (4) || 28,419 || 21–29 || L2
|-style=background:#bfb
|51||May 30||Tigers|| 1–0 || Skoglund (1–0) || Verlander (4–4) || Herrera (12) || 21,864 || 22–29 || W1
|-style=background:#fbb
|52||May 31||Tigers|| 5–6 || Saupold (1–0) || Kennedy (0–5) || Wilson (5) || 24,347 || 22–30 || L1
|-

|-style=background:#bfb
|53||June 2||Indians|| 4–0 || Vargas (7–3) || Tomlin (3–7) ||—|| 33,408 || 23–30 || W1
|-style=background:#bfb
|54||June 3||Indians|| 12–5 || Hammel (2–6)|| Carrasco (5–3) ||—|| 26,497 || 24–30 || W2
|-style=background:#fbb
|55||June 4||Indians|| 0–8 || Otero (1–0) || Skoglund (1–1) ||—|| 28,185 || 24–31 || L1
|-style=background:#fbb
|56||June 5||Astros|| 3–7 || Fiers (2–2) || Kennedy (0–6) ||—|| 21,892 || 24–32 || L2
|-style=background:#bfb
|57||June 6||Astros|| 9–7 || Minor (3–1) || Giles (1–2) ||—|| 20,974 || 25–32 || W1
|-style=background:#bfb
|58||June 7||Astros|| 7–5 || Vargas (8–3) || Díaz (0–1) || Herrera (13) || 25,628 || 26–32 || W2
|-style=background:#fbb
|59||June 8||Astros|| 1–6 || Harris (2–1) || Herrera (1–2) ||—|| 32,747 || 26–33 || L1
|-style=background:#fbb
|60||June 9||@ Padres|| 3–6 || Chacín (5–5) || Strahm (1–3) || Maurer (10) || 23,055 || 26–34 || L2
|-style=background:#bfb
|61||June 10||@ Padres|| 12–6 || Wood (1–2) || Hand (1–4) ||—|| 26,107 || 27–34 || W1
|-style=background:#bfb
|62||June 11||@ Padres|| 8–3 || Junis (2–0) || Lamet (2–2) ||—|| 25,599 || 28–34 || W2
|-style=background:#bfb
|63||June 13||@ Giants|| 8–1 || Vargas (9–3) || Blach (4–4) ||—|| 41,284 || 29–34 || W3
|-style=background:#bfb
|64||June 14||@ Giants|| 7–2 || Hammel (3–6) || Cueto (5–6) ||—|| 41,144 || 30–34 || W4
|-style=background:#bfb
|65||June 15||@ Angels|| 7–2 || Strahm (2–3) || Nolasco (2–8) ||—|| 34,884 || 31–34 || W5
|-style=background:#bfb
|66||June 16||@ Angels|| 3–1 || Kennedy (1–6) || Chavez (5–7) || Herrera (14) || 34,184 || 32–34 || W6
|-style=background:#fbb
|67||June 17||@ Angels|| 0–9 || Meyer (3–3) || Junis (2–1) ||—|| 41,209 || 32–35 || L1
|-style=background:#bfb
|68||June 18||@ Angels|| 7–3 || Vargas (10–3) || Ramirez (6–5) || Herrera (15) || 40,178 || 33–35 || W1
|-style=background:#bfb
|69||June 19||Red Sox|| 4–2 || Hammel (4–6) || Boyer (0–1) || Herrera (16) || 27,992 || 34–35 || W2
|-style=background:#fbb
|70||June 20||Red Sox|| 3–8 || Sale (9–3) || Strahm (2–4) ||—|| 25,983 || 34–36 || L1
|-style=background:#bfb
|71||June 21||Red Sox|| 6–4 || Soria (3–2) || Scott (0–1) || Herrera (17) || 30,826 || 35–36 || W1
|-style=background:#bfb
|72||June 23||Blue Jays|| 5–4 || Soria (4–2) || Loup (2–1) ||—|| 38,848 || 36–36 || W2
|-style=background:#bfb
|72||June 24||Blue Jays|| 3–2 || Vargas (11–3) || Estrada (4–6) || Herrera (18) || 26,938 || 37–36 || W3
|-style=background:#fbb
|74||June 25||Blue Jays|| 2–8 || Liriano (4–3) || Alexander (0–2) || — || 37,182 || 37–37 || L1
|-style=background:#fbb
|75||June 27||@ Tigers|| 3–5 || Verlander (5–4) || Strahm (2–5) || J. Wilson (7) || 29,488 || 37–38 || L2
|-style=background:#bfb
|76||June 28||@ Tigers|| 8–2 || Kennedy (2–6) || Norris (4–6) || — || 29,614 || 38–38 || W1
|-style=background:#fbb
|77||June 29||@ Tigers|| 3–7 || Fulmer (7–6) || Junis (2–2) || — || 33,681 || 38–39 || L1
|-style=background:#bfb
|78||June 30||Twins|| 8–1 || Vargas (12–3) || Santana (10–5) || — || 34,332 || 39–39 || W1
|-

|-style=background:#bfb
|79||July 1 (1)||Twins|| 11–6 || Minor (4–1) || Duffey (0–2) || — || 25,571 || 40–39 || W2
|-style=background:#fbb
|80||July 1 (2)||Twins|| 5–10 || Jorge (1–0) || Hammel (4–7) || — || 32,448 || 40–40 || L1
|-style=background:#bfb
|81||July 2||Twins|| 6–2 || Alexander (1–2) || Santiago (4–8) ||—|| 28,775 || 41–40 || W1
|-style=background:#bfb
|82||July 3||@ Mariners|| 3–1 || Kennedy (3–6) || Moore (1–1) || Soria (1) || 35,789 || 42–40 || W2
|-style=background:#bfb
|83||July 4||@ Mariners|| 7–3 || Duffy (5–4) || Hernandez (3–3) ||—|| 25,555 || 43–40 || W3
|-style=background:#bfb
|84||July 5||@ Mariners|| 9–6 || Minor (7–5) || Pazos (2–2) || Herrera (19) || 15,157 || 44–40 || W4
|-style=background:#fbb
|85||July 7||@ Dodgers|| 1–4 || Maeda (7–4) || Hammel (4–8) || Jansen (21) || 48,017 || 44–41 || L1
|-style=background:#fbb
|86||July 8||@ Dodgers|| 4–5 (10) || Stripling (1–3) || Alexander (1–3)  || — || 45,225 || 44–42 || L2
|-style=background:#fbb
|87||July 9||@ Dodgers|| 2–5 || Kershaw (14–2) || Duffy (5–5) || — || 41,524 || 44–43 || L3
|-style="text-align:center; background:#bbcaff;"
|colspan="10"|88th All-Star Game in Miami, Florida
|-style=background:#fbb
|88||July 14||Rangers|| 3–5 || Pérez (5–6) || Minor (5–2) || Claudio (2) || 35,591 || 44–44 || L4
|-style=background:#fbb
|89||July 15||Rangers|| 0–1 || Leclerc (2–2) || Duffy (5–6) || Claudio (3) || 32,907 || 44–45 || L5
|-style=background:#bfb
|90||July 16||Rangers|| 4–3 || Herrera (2–2) || Grilli (2–5) ||—|| 23,163 || 45–45 || W1
|-style=background:#fbb
|91||July 17||Tigers|| 2–10 || Zimmermann (6–7) || Vargas (12–4) || — || 26,359 || 45–46 || L1
|-style=background:#fbb
|92||July 18||Tigers|| 3–9 || Boyd (3–5) || Wood (1–3) || — || 22,908 || 45–47 || L2
|-style=background:#bfb
|93||July 19||Tigers|| 4–3 || McCarthy (1–0) || J. Wilson (3–4) || — || 30,105 || 46–47 || W1
|-style=background:#bfb
|94||July 20||Tigers|| 16–4 || Duffy (6–6) || Fulmer (10–7) || — || 29,018 || 47–47 || W2
|-style=background:#bfb
|95||July 21||White Sox|| 7–6 (10) || Feliz (2–5) || Clippard (1–6) ||—|| 29,647 || 48–47 || W3
|-style=background:#bfb
|96||July 22||White Sox|| 7–2 || Alexander (2–3) || Holmberg (1–3) ||—|| 34,088 || 49–47 || W4
|-style=background:#bfb
|97||July 23||White Sox|| 5–4 || Herrera (3–2) || Infante (0–1) || — || 23,184 || 50–47 || W5
|-style=background:#bfb
|98||July 24||@ Tigers|| 5–3 (12) || Junis (3–2) || VerHagen (0–1) || Herrera (20) || 26,415 || 51–47 || W6
|-style=background:#bfb
|99||July 25||@ Tigers|| 3–1 || Duffy (7–6) || Fulmer (10–8) || Herrera (21) || 27,259 || 52–47 || W7
|-style=background:#bfb
|100||July 26||@ Tigers|| 16–2 || Kennedy (4–6) || Sánchez (2–1) || — || 29,073 || 53–47 || W8
|-style=background:#bfb
|101||July 28||@ Red Sox|| 4–2 || Vargas (13–4) || Porcello (4–14) || Herrera (22) || 37,321 || 54–47 || W9
|-style=background:#fbb
|102||July 29||@ Red Sox|| 8–9 (10) || Barnes (6–2) || Minor (5–3) || — || 36,912 || 54–48 || L1
|-style=background:#bfb
|103||July 30||@ Red Sox|| 5–3 || Hammel (5–8) || Barnes (6–3) || Herrera (23) || 36,480 || 55–48 || W1
|-style=background:#fbb
|104||July 31||@ Orioles|| 1–2 || Britton (1–0) || Soria (4–3) || — || 20,663 || 55–49 || L1
|-

|-style=background:#fbb
|105||August 1||@ Orioles|| 2–7 || Bundy (10–8) || Kennedy (4–7) || — || 20,931 || 55–50 || L2
|-style=background:#fbb
|106||August 2||@ Orioles|| 0–6 || Hellickson (7–5) || Vargas (13–5) || — || 14,984 || 55–51 || L3
|-style=background:#bfb
|107||August 3||Mariners|| 6–4 || Buchter (4–3) || Pagan (0–2) || Herrera (24) || 29,228 || 56–51 || W1
|-style=background:#fbb
|108||August 4||Mariners|| 2–5 || Paxton (12–3) || Hammel (5–9) || Diaz (22) || 38,130 || 56–52 || L1
|-style=background:#bbb
|—||August 5||Mariners|| || colspan=7 | PPD, RAIN; Rescheduled for August 6
|-style=background:#fbb
|109||August 6||Mariners|| 7–8 || Pazos (3–3) || Duffy (7–7) || Díaz (23) ||  || 56–53 || L2
|-style=background:#bfb
|110||August 6||Mariners|| 9–1 || Junis (4–2) || Ramírez (4–4) || — || 29,432 || 57–53 || W1
|-style=background:#fbb
|111||August 7||Cardinals|| 3–11 || Martinez (8–9) || Kennedy (4–8) || — || 38,478 || 57–54 || L1
|-style=background:#fbb
|112||August 8||Cardinals|| 3–10 || Wacha (9–4) || Vargas (13–6) || — || 37,267 || 57–55 || L2
|-style=background:#fbb
|113||August 9||@ Cardinals|| 5–8 || Bowman (3–4) || Maurer (1–5) || Rosenthal (9) || 44,139 || 57–56 || L3
|-style=background:#fbb
|114||August 10||@ Cardinals|| 6–8 || Lyons (1–0) || Minor (5–4) || Rosenthal (10) || 41,706 || 57–57 || L4
|-style=background:#fbb
|115||August 11||@ White Sox|| 3–6 || Bummer (1–2) || Duffy (7–8) || Clippard (3) || 18,137 || 57–58 || L5
|-style=background:#bfb
|116||August 12||@ White Sox|| 5–4 || Alexander (3–3) || Bummer (1–3) || Herrera (25) || 20,413 || 58–58 || W1
|-style=background:#bfb
|117||August 13||@ White Sox|| 14–6 || Vargas (14–6) || Holland (6–12) || — || 27,351 || 59–58 || W2
|-style=background:#bfb
|118||August 14||@ A's|| 6–2 || Junis (5–2) || Cotton (5–10) || — || 9,848 || 60–58 || W3
|-style=background:#fbb
|119||August 15||@ A's|| 8–10 || Treinen (1–2) || Minor (5–5) || — || 13,875 || 60–59 || L1
|-style=background:#bfb
|120||August 16||@ A's|| 7–6 || Maurer (2–5) || Treinen (1–3) || Herrera (26) || 15,239 || 61–59 || W1
|-style=background:#fbb
|121||August 18||Indians|| 1–10 || Kluber (12–3) || Kennedy (4–9) || — || 35,974 || 61–60 || L1
|-style=background:#fbb
|122||August 19||Indians|| 0–5 || Bauer (12–8) || Vargas (14–7) || — || 34,204 || 61–61 || L2
|-style=background:#bfb
|123||August 20||Indians|| 7–4 || Hammel (6–9) || Salazar (5–6) ||—|| 27,417 || 62–61 || W1
|-style=background:#bfb
|124||August 22||Rockies|| 3–2 || Duffy (8–8) || Gray (5–3) || Alexander (1) || 22,868 || 63–61 || W2
|-style=background:#bfb
|125||August 23||Rockies|| 6–4 || Maurer (3–5) || Holland (2–5) || — || 25,752 || 64–61 || W3
|-style=background:#fbb
|126||August 24||Rockies|| 2–3 || Ottavino (2–3) || Minor (5–6) || Holland (36) || 25,314 || 64–62 || L1
|-style=background:#fbb
|127||August 25||@ Indians|| 0–4 || Merritt (1–0) || Vargas (14–8) || — || 34,061 || 64–63 || L2
|-style=background:#fbb
|128||August 26||@ Indians|| 0–4 || Clevinger (7–5) || Hammel (6–10) || — || 34,273 || 64–64 || L3
|-style=background:#fbb
|129||August 27||@ Indians|| 0–12 || Carrasco (13–6) || Skoglund (1–2) || — || 32,229 || 64–65 || L4
|-style=background:#fbb
|130||August 28||Rays|| 0–12 || Pruitt (7–3) || Kennedy (4–10) || Andriese (1) || 21,866 || 64–66 || L5
|-style=background:#bfb
|131||August 29||Rays|| 6–2 || Junis (6–2) || Cobb (9–9) || — || 25,204 || 65–66 || W1
|-style=background:#fbb
|132||August 30||Rays|| 3–5 || Odorizzi (7–7) || Vargas (14–9) || Colomé (40) || 25,916 || 65–67 || L1
|-

|-style=background:#bfb
|133||September 1||@ Twins|| 7–6 || Hammel (7–10) || Gee (1–2) || Alexander (2) || 24,068 || 66–67 || W1
|-style=background:#fbb
|134||September 2||@ Twins|| 0–17 || Gibson (9–10) || Garcia (0–1) || — || 33,413 || 66–68 || L1
|-style=background:#bfb
|135||September 3||@ Twins|| 5–4 || Alexander (4–3) || Busenitz (1–1) || Maurer (21) || 32,234 || 67–68 || W1
|-style=background:#bfb
|136||September 4||@ Tigers|| 7–6 || Junis (7–2) || Lewicki (0–1) || Alexander (3) || 24,804 || 68–68 || W3
|-style=background:#fbb
|137||September 5||@ Tigers|| 2–13 || Jaye (1–0) || Vargas (14–10) || — || , || 68–69 || L1
|-style=background:#bfb
|138||September 6||@ Tigers|| 13–2 || Hammel (8–10) || Boyd (5–9) || — || 23,755 || 69–69 || W1
|-style=background:#fbb
|139||September 7||Twins|| 2–4 || Hildenberger (3–2) || Herrera (3–3) || Belisle (6) || 26,485 || 69–70 || L1
|-style=background:#fbb
|140||September 8||Twins|| 5–8 || Santana (8–5) || Kennedy (4–11) || Belisle (7) || 31,879 || 69–71 || L2
|-style=background:#bfb
|141||September 9||Twins|| 5–2 || Minor (6–6) || Pressly (2–3) || Maurer (2) || 29,991 || 70–71 || W1
|-style=background:#bfb
|142||September 10||Twins|| 11–3 || Vargas (15–10) || Colón (6–12) || — || 35,003 || 71–71 || W2
|-style=background:#fbb
|143||September 11||White Sox|| 3–11 || López (1–3) || Hammel (8–11) || — || 23,135 || 71–72 || L1
|-style=background:#bfb
|144||September 12||White Sox|| 4–3 || Gaviglio (4–5) || Covey (0–5) || Alexander (4) || 17,727 || 72–72 || W1
|-style=background:#fbb
|145||September 13||White Sox|| 3–5 || Minaya (3–2) || Alexander (4–4) || — || 25,665 || 72–73 || L1
|-style=background:#fbb
|146||September 14||@ Indians|| 2–3 (10) || Allen (3–6) || Maurer (3–6) || — || 30,874 || 72–74 || L2
|-style=background:#bfb
|147||September 15||@ Indians|| 4–3 || Vargas (16–10) || Bauer (16–9) || Minor (1) || 34,025 || 73–74 || W1
|-style=background:#fbb
|148||September 16||@ Indians|| 4–8 || Carrasco (16–6) || Hammel (8–12) || — || 33,688 || 73–75 || L1
|-style=background:#fbb
|149||September 17||@ Indians|| 2–3 || Kluber (17–4) || Duffy (8–9) || Allen (28) || 32,313 || 73–76 || L2
|-style=background:#fbb
|150||September 19||@ Blue Jays|| 2–5 || Stroman (12–8) || Kennedy (4–12) || Osuna (37) || 33,554 || 73–77 || L3
|-style=background:#bfb
|151||September 20||@ Blue Jays|| 15–5 || Junis (8–2) || Anderson (1–2) ||—|| 33,050 || 74–77 || W1
|-style=background:#bfb
|152||September 21||@ Blue Jays|| 1–0 || Vargas (17–10) || Happ (9–11) || Minor (2) || 35,861 || 75–77 || W2
|-style=background:#fbb
|153||September 22||@ White Sox|| 6–7 || López (3–3) || Hammel (8–13) || Minaya (6) || 18,041 || 75–78 || L1
|-style=background:#bfb
|154||September 23||@ White Sox|| 8–2 || Duffy (9–9) || Covey (0–7) || — || 20,306 || 76–78 || W1
|-style=background:#fbb
|155||September 24||@ White Sox|| 1–8 || Giolito (3–3) || Kennedy (4–13) || — || 18,791 || 76–79 || L1
|-style=background:#fbb
|156||September 25||@ Yankees|| 3–11 || Sabathia (13–5) || Junis (8–3) || — || 40,023 || 76–80 || L2
|-style=background:#bfb
|157||September 26||Tigers|| 2–1 || Vargas (18–10) || Sánchez (3–6) || Minor (3) || 20,613 || 77–80 || W1
|-style=background:#bfb
|158||September 27||Tigers|| 7–4 || Alexander (5–4) || VerHagen (0–3) || Minor (4) || 21,319 || 78–80 || W2
|-style=background:#fbb
|159||September 28||Tigers|| 1–4 || Norris (5–8) || Duffy (9–10) || Greene (8) || 21,650 || 78–81 || L1
|-style=background:#bfb
|160||September 29||D-Backs|| 2–1 || Kennedy (5–13) || Greinke (17–7) || Minor (5) || 23,488 || 79–81 || W1
|-style=background:#bfb
|161||September 30||D-Backs|| 4–3 || Junis (9–3) || Bradley (3–3) || Minor (6) || 32,727 || 80–81 || W2
|-style=background:#fbb
|162||October 1||D-Backs|| 2–14 || Banda (2–3) || Vargas (18–11) || — || 32,277 || 80–82 || L1
|-

|- style="text-align:center;"
| Legend:       = Win       = Loss       = PostponementBold = Royals team member

Season standings

American League Central

American League Wild Card

Record against opponents

Roster

Awards
First baseman Eric Hosmer won the Silver Slugger Award as the best offensive player at his position in the American League.

Farm system

References

External links
Kansas City Royals Official Site 
2017 Kansas City Royals at Baseball Reference

Kansas City Royals
Kansas City Royals seasons
Kansas City Royals